Mohammed Abi Samra (born 1953) is a Lebanese journalist and novelist. He studied at the Lebanese University, and has been a cultural journalist at leading Arabic publications such as Al-Safir, Al-Nahar and Al-Hayat. His novels include: 
 Pauline and Her Ghosts (1990) 
 The Former Man (1995)
 Inhabitants of the Pictures (2003) 
 Women Without Influence (2017)
 Women Without Trace (2019)  

Women Without Trace was nominated for the Arabic Booker Prize.

References

Lebanese novelists
1953 births
Living people
Lebanese journalists